While the United States has relatively complicated maritime boundaries, it shares international land borders with only two nations:

 The Canada–United States border to the north of the contiguous United States and to the east of Alaska, and 
 The Mexico–United States border to the south.

Maritime boundaries
Out in the ocean, the US borders are more complex.

The Russia–United States maritime boundary was defined by an agreement made by the United States and the USSR in 1990 covering the Bering Sea, Bering Strait, and Arctic Ocean. The boundary line generally follows the  1867 Alaska Cession line, but the agreement has not entered into force. The USA ratified the USSR–USA Maritime Boundary Agreement, but the USSR failed to ratify it before dissolving, and it has not been ratified by Russia. 

The United States has entered maritime boundary agreements with Mexico, Cuba, Venezuela, and with the United Kingdom in the Caribbean. The maritime boundary with Canada in the Atlantic was determined by the International Court of Justice in the Gulf of Maine Case (1984). M.B. Feldman, Association for Diplomatic Studies and Training, Foreign Oral History Collection https://adst.org/OH%20TOCs/Feldman.Mark.pdf  The United States also shares a maritime boundary with the Bahamas and three more with Canada that remain to be determined.

Custom territories
Insular areas in the Pacific and the U.S. Virgin Islands are in a separate customs territory from the 50 states, the District of Columbia, and Puerto Rico. For more information on customs territories, see Foreign trade of the United States.

Border disputes 

The US also has disputed land borders with seven nations:

 
 Machias Seal Island and North Rock (New Brunswick and Maine) - Occupied by Canada and patrolled by the Canadian Coast Guard, claimed by the US.
 
 Guantanamo Bay Naval Base - Since the Cuban Revolution of 1959, the Cuban communist government has consistently protested against the U.S. presence on Cuban soil and called it "illegal" under international law. The US acquired the bay from the Spanish-American War as a lease from Cuba.

 Navassa Island - The US claimed the Navassa island via the Guano Islands Act of 1856. Haiti claimed sovereignty over the island in 1801, but was occupied by the US through gunboat diplomacy.
 Bajo Nuevo Bank - Administered by Colombia, claimed by the US as an unorganized, unincorporated territory.
 Serranilla Bank - Administered by Colombia, claimed by the US as an unorganized, unincorporated territory.

Additionally, the US has maritime border disputes with Canada:

 Strait of Juan de Fuca
 Beaufort Sea - Yukon–Alaska dispute
 Dixon Entrance - Dispute stems from the ambiguity of the Hay–Herbert Treaty in 1903 between the United States and the United Kingdom signed to settle the Alaska boundary dispute, an agreement opposed by Canadian leaders.

Agencies
U.S. Customs and Border Protection is responsible for policing the borders and inspecting people and goods being imported.

The United States Coast Guard actively patrols the nation's extensive maritime borders.

The United States Armed Forces and state and local police may also become involved in border enforcement in certain circumstances.

Total list

See also
 Border irregularities of the United States

References

External links
 Border Security at CBP
 Secure and Manage Borders at DHS
 Border Security at the WhiteHouse.gov
 The Constitution in the 100-Mile Border Zone at ACLU
 U.S. Maritime Boundaries: Agreements and Treaties at U.S. Dept of State

 
Geography of the United States